Talmadge Raphael Nunnari (born April 9, 1975 in Pensacola, Florida) is a former Major League Baseball player. Nunnari played for first base and outfield for the Montreal Expos in 2000 and was the assistant coach for the Jacksonville University Dolphins baseball team. Nunnari played his college ball at Jacksonville University.

In the 2009 and 2010 seasons, Nunnari was manager of the independent club the Pensacola Pelicans after having worked in the team's front office first as a corporate sales executive and hitting coach and then general manager since 2003. Nunnari worked with the organization's transition from the independent American Association to the affiliated AA Southern League but left to accept the position at JU.

References

External links
, or Retrosheet
Pura Pelota (Venezuelan Winter League)

1975 births
Living people
American expatriate baseball players in Canada
Baseball players from Pensacola, Florida
Cape Fear Crocs players
Harrisburg Senators players
Jacksonville Dolphins baseball players
Jupiter Hammerheads players
Major League Baseball first basemen
Minor league baseball managers
Montreal Expos players
Ottawa Lynx players
Pastora de los Llanos players
Pensacola Pelicans players
Tiburones de La Guaira players
American expatriate baseball players in Venezuela
Vermont Expos players